Zone of Our Own is an album by the American supergroup Texas Tornados, released in 1991. The first two singles were "Is Anybody Goin' to San Antone" and "La Mucura". Videos for the singles were shot in San Antonio.

The album was nominated for a Grammy Award, in the "Best Country Performance By a Duo or Group with Vocal" category.

Production
The album was produced by Bill Halverson and the band. The members often recorded separately, which they determined that they didn't like. "El Pantalon Blue Jean" was written by the father of Flaco Jimenez. "Volver" and "La Mucura" are traditional folk tunes. Three songs are sung solely in Spanish.

Critical reception

The Austin American-Statesman wrote: "While there's too much soulful artistry involved to be properly showcased within the space of a single album, Zone of Our Own underscores the crucial connections between the Sir Douglas Quintet-style rock of Doug Sahm, the border (and border-transcending) musics of Freddy Fender and Flaco Jimenez and the Tejano-flavored country of Augie Meyers." USA Today noted that the band uses "everything from German polkas to psychedelic rock to Mexican boleros."

The Edmonton Journal determined that "the one true riveting moment on Zone of Our Own comes from a pan-fried, rollicking reworking of Is Anyone Goin' to San Antone". The Chicago Tribune stated that the band has "a clear understanding of and deep love for the many musics that swirl across the Lone Star State."

AllMusic concluded that "for all the sonic diversity of the Texas Tornados, Zone of Our Own still sounds like it's all of a piece, like the play list of some blessedly eclectic radio station beaming out along the border, as the four frontmen bounce off each other with joyous aplomb." The Rolling Stone Album Guide opined that "swagger this assured takes years to muster."

Track listing

References

Texas Tornados albums
1991 albums
Reprise Records albums